Zăvoi may refer to the following places in Romania:

Zăvoi, a commune in Caraș-Severin County
Zăvoi, a village in Ștefănești town, Argeș County
Zăvoi, a village in Sălașu de Sus Commune, Hunedoara County
Zăvoi (river), a tributary of the Hârtibaciu in Sibiu County